Nabadwip Haldar was an Indian actor, comedian and theater personality who is known for work in Bengali cinema.

Early life
Haldar was born in 1911 in Sonpalashi village, Burdwan district in British India. After completion of his primary education he could not study further and started working at Calcutta Electric Supply Corporation. Haldar also took part-time jobs in different companies in Kolkata.

Career
Haldar's debut film was Panchashar made by Debaki Kumar Bose in 1931. He became popular for his character named Madan in the film Sharey Chuattor. Haldar performed in a comedy duo with actor Shyam Laha in various films as the Bengali version of Laurel and Hardy. He was well known for his unique voice and comic roles. He also acted in a number of radio comic series.

Partial filmography
 Panchashar (1931)
 Graher Fer (1937)
 Sonar Sansar (1936)
 Sarbajanin Bibahotsab (1938)
 Shahar Thekey Durey (1943)
 Dukkhe Jader Jibon Gora (1946)
 Kalo Chhaya (1948)
 Sadharan Meye (1948)
 Kuasha (1949)
 Sandhabelar Roopkatha (1950)
 Kankantala Light Railway (1950)
 Baikunther Will (1950)
 Maryada (1950)
 Hanabari (1952)
 Manikjor (1952)
 Sharey Chuattor (1953)
 Lakh Taka (1953)
 Moyla Kagaj (1954)
 Chheley Kaar (1954)
 Nishiddho Phal (1955)
 Saheb Bibi Golam (film) (1956)
 Dui Bechara (1960)
 Kathin Maya (1961)
 Marutrisha (1964)

References

External links
 

1911 births
Year of death missing
Male actors in Bengali cinema
Indian stand-up comedians
Indian male radio actors
People from West Bengal
Male actors from Kolkata
20th-century Indian male actors